, son of Nobufusa and Sassa Teruko, the daughter of Sassa Narimasa, was a kugyo or Japanese court noble of the early Edo period (1603–1868). He held a regent position kampaku from 1612 to 1615. Norihira was his son.

Family 
Parents
Father: Takatsukasa Nobufusa (鷹司 信房, 17 November 1565 – 18 January 1658)
Mother: Sassa Teruko (佐々輝子,d.1630), daughter of Sassa Narimasa
Consorts ansd issue: 
Wife: Imperial Princess Seishi (清子内親王; 1593–1674), daughter of Emperor Go-Yōzei
Takatsukasa Norihira (鷹司 教平, 14 February 1609 – 7 November 1668), first son
Lady Taikō-in (大光院), first daughter
Lady Shunkō-in (春光院), second daughter

References

 

1590 births
1621 deaths
Fujiwara clan
Takatsukasa family